Jennie Cannon may refer to:
 Jennie V. Cannon, American artist
 Jennie Curtis Cannon, American suffragist